Club Atlético Bucaramanga S.A., better known as Atlético Bucaramanga, is a Colombian professional football team based in Bucaramanga. The club plays its home games at the Alfonso López stadium.

The club was founded on 11 May 1949 by Rafael Chaberman, a Barranquilla businessman. Ever since, it has been a regular participant in the top flight of the Colombian professional league. The team's most recent stint in the top division began in 2015.

The club's greatest achievement to date took place in 1997, when they reached the finals of the Colombian football league, losing to América de Cali. That performance qualified them for the ensuing Copa Libertadores de América, in which they reached the second round.

History
Atlético Bucaramanga's origins can be found in the regional football league of the Santander Department. Like most of Colombia's departments, Santander had a local league. However, they did not have a team capable of competing for national honors. A number of local teams hoped to change that and found a professional club that could aspire to that level.

In 1948, the directors of "Pielroja" (the most recent local champions) invited city businessman Rafael Chaberman to assist in setting up a professional team. Following Haberman's advice, the directors enlisted local businessmen, newspapers, and radio stations to promote a team. A board was assembled with Dr. Elias Solano as president, assisted by managing directors Rafael Chaberman, Vicente Díaz, Miguel González, Juan B. Silva (Treasurer), Manuel José Puyana, Eduardo Villa, Jorge Reyes Puyana, José Vicente Niño, Gustavo Mantilla, Rafael Pérez, Enrique Orduz, and Luis Fernando Sanmiguel.

The club was officially established on 11 May 1949, under the name of Club Atlético Bucaramanga. The key to the club's early foundation was the support of local clubs, and they had it—presidents of Gran Colombia FC (Vicente Díaz Romero), Eleven Friends FC (Luis Alba Pinilla), Girardot FC (Antonio "Terremoto" Durán), Freedom Concordia FC (Jorge Molina Barba) and Pielroja FC (Simón Santander) were all on board and helped supply the team with players. The result was that the club quickly assembled a team composed of players from Bucaramanga, Barrancabermeja and Barranquilla, most of whom had some experience playing at a high level. The three Guerrero brothers (center half Francisco, left wing Juan, and inside right Jorge) were an example of this sort of local talent. The club was also managed by a local, former Millonarios player Francisco "Pacho" Carvajal.

In 1949, the club applied for membership in the Colombian league and was accepted after winning a playoff match with Once Deportivo from Manizales. On 1 May 1949, Atlético Bucaramanga played its first game in the Colombian football tournament, losing to Deportivo Cali 5–1 at the Estadio Alfonso López.

This was their roster for that match:

Players

Substitutions

Coach
 Francisco Carvajal

Their first victory came on June 19, when they defeated Boca Juniors de Cali 2–1. The club ultimately finished the season in tenth place out of 12 teams.

Like many other Colombian clubs, Atlético Bucaramanga took advantage of the El Dorado period to sign a host of foreign players. Specifically, in 1950 they signed four Argentine players, a group collectively known as the "Four Musketeers". They were Antonio "Toto" Bernasconi (half-back), Norberto Juan Peluffo (center-half), Aristóbulo Deambrosi (right winger) and José Cayetano Fraccione (goalkeeper), nicknamed "the Flying Fish". This was just the beginning of the club's aggressive pursuit of foreign players, including the signing of Costa Rican forward José Joaquín "El Quincho" Quiroz.  Quiroz in particular was known for his spectacular goals. With that group in place, the club managed a sixth-place finish in 1950. The period of success did not last. Bucaramanga had overspent during El Dorado, and the crunch quickly followed. By 1953, the club was dead last and in 1954 was out of the league entirely. However, the club did not disappear. They rebuilt, and in 1956 made it back to the league.

Not only that, their connection to Argentina remained intact. The manager responsible for that rebuild, Felipe "Judio" Stemberg, was Argentine, and he brought a number of his countrymen into the side. The most important of those acquisitions was José Américo Montanini, a former striker for River Plate. He arrived at Bucaramanga in 1956, playing for them from 1956 to 1961 and from 1964 to 1968. Montanini's most successful season was the 1958 one, when he led the league in scoring with 36 goals. The club also enjoyed their most successful season yet, finishing third behind champions Santa Fe and runners-up Millonarios.

1960 should have been remembered as an even more glorious season. With Montanini and José Giarrizzo (another Argentinian) leading the attack, the club had a real shot at its first-ever championship. Just three matches remained when the club set out for Bogotá to face the league leaders, Santa Fe. However, the match was a disaster; Santa Fe romped to a 5–1 win, humiliating a Bucaramanga club that looked completely outmatched. Rather than winning the championship, the club finished in a disappointing third place. Much of the blame was put on manager Juan Barbieri, who was literally run out of town during the offseason.

It would be many years before Los Leopardos came that close again. Throughout the 1960s, 1970s, and 1980s, the club was mid-table only in their best years, more frequently finishing towards the bottom. They even had to sit out the 1971 season due to economic problems, selling their place to a team from Cartagena in order to pay off their debts.

The club enjoyed a brief revival in the 1990s with the hiring of Humberto Ortiz as manager. A defensive manager first and foremost, Ortiz's teams were physical rather than stylish, but they were competitive.  He spent three years with Bucaramanga, leading them to a third-place finish in 1990, then consecutive mid-table finishes in 1991 and 1992. The club was almost unbeatable at home, losing just six out of 75 matches in their home stadium. However, in 1993 Ortiz was dismissed in favor of Norberto Peluffo, who promised a more open and attacking style of play but delivered a leaky defense in return. In 1994, Bucaramanga finished dead last in the top flight and was relegated for the first time in its history.

However, their first spell in the Categoría Primera B was short. Colombian football league was scheduled to switch to the European calendar in mid-1995 and as a result, a 4-month championship was organized prior to the change in format. Bucaramanga dominated this short tournament, and won eight out of ten matches played during the promotion round. They were promoted as Categoría Primera B champions. Key to their success was keeper Guillermo Rodolfo Guarnieri, who set a Colombian record by playing 1122 minutes (13 matches and part of a 14th) without giving up a single goal. The 1995 Torneo Adecuación ended with Bucaramanga claiming the title and returning to the top tier for the 1995–96 season.

Atlético Bucaramanga's best campaign to date was achieved in the 1996–97 season. This campaign lasted sixteen months, making it the longest in Colombian football history. The club was managed that year by Carlos Mario Hoyos, a former defender for Deportivo Cali. His roster had no stars, and in fact was mostly composed of the same players who had led the club to the Primera B title two years prior. The team performed as expected in the first half of the season, achieving unremarkable results. However, they suddenly came together in the Torneo Adecuación, finishing second overall and earning a playoff with Deportes Quindío to determine the Adecuación winners, which would be playing the championship final. A 90th-minute goal by Orlando Ballesteros won the two-legged tie for Bucaramanga and sent them into the final against América de Cali, who had won the Apertura tournament. Although América won both legs of the final, the runner-up finish in the tournament allowed Bucaramanga to qualify for the 1998 Copa Libertadores. In that tournament, they qualified out of their first round group and reached the knockout stages, where they lost to Bolivian side Bolívar in the second round.

The 1996–97 season, however, did not fundamentally change the club's fortunes, and they once again slipped down the table. In 2001, they finished last place over two stages and were relegated again. However, DIMAYOR decided to expand the top flight from 16 to 18 teams for the 2002 season, which offered Bucaramanga the chance to save themselves in a triangular playoff with Primera B teams Cúcuta Deportivo and Unión Magdalena. Bucaramanga's second-place finish (including a win in penalties over arch-rivals Cúcuta Deportivo) was good enough to keep the team in the top tier despite being unable to score a single goal in both matches of the playoff.

Los Leopardos qualified for the semifinal stage in both tournaments of the 2002 season as well as the 2004 Finalización tournament, but in the mid-2000s their fortunes began to decline. They narrowly avoided relegation in 2007, but failed to escape the drop in 2008, sealing their relegation in the last match of the first stage of that year's Finalización with a 3–0 loss to Deportivo Pereira, who were the other side with a chance to get relegated that season.

Back in Primera B for 2009, Atlético Bucaramanga reached the season finals but were upset over two legs by Cortuluá and lost the promotion play-off to Deportivo Pereira. Seven tumultuous seasons in the second tier followed up, and there were points at which the club was not even seriously contending for promotion; despite spending huge sums of money to assemble a contending squad in 2010, they finished a miserable 14th. Finally, in 2015, the club broke out of Primera B. Despite missing a chance to be promoted early in the season in a similar tournament to the one played in Cartagena in 2001, they dominated the season by collecting 71 points in 32 matches during the first stage, and then topped a semifinal group which also included América de Cali, Real Cartagena, and Universitario Popayán. With promotion already assured, Atlético Bucaramanga defeated Fortaleza over two legs to win their second Primera B title.

Since their return to the top flight, the team's performances have been enough to keep them away from the relegation contention. They reached the semifinals of the Finalización tournament in 2016 and the quarterfinals of the 2017 Apertura and 2018 Finalización.

Club Nicknames
Atlético Bucaramanga fans and the press are fond of the nickname "Los Leopardos" (The Leopards). This name was coined in the 1950s and comes from the club's yellowish uniforms, which resemble the animal's fur. The club and its fans are also sometimes referred to as "Los Búcaros", after the Búcaro tree that gives the city of Bucaramanga its name.

Stadium

Atlético Bucaramanga plays its home games in the Alfonso López stadium.
 Opened: 1941, renovated 2017.
 Surface: Bermuda Grass.
 Capacity: 28,000

From 2016 to mid-2017, the team used the Alvaro Gomez Hurtado stadium (capacity: 10,000) in the neighboring Floridablanca, since the Alfonso Lopez stadium was being renovated.

East Colombian Derby
Atlético Bucaramanga and Cúcuta Deportivo play in one of Colombia's most heated rivalries, El Clásico del oriente colombiano (East Colombian Derby, also known as the Great Santander Derby).  The first match in the rivalry was on 2 April 1950 at the Estadio Alfonso López. Cúcuta won 1–0 on a goal by Luis Alberto Miloc. Since 1950, this derby has been played 180 times; Atlético Bucaramanga have won 57 times, Cúcuta have won 61 times, and there have been 59 draws.

Although Cúcuta have had the upper hand in general, Bucaramanga won the most important game of the series in 2001. The two teams were competing in a triangular playoff to determine which club would compete in the top tier of Colombian football during the following season. The match, played in Cartagena, was scoreless for 90 minutes as well as 30 minutes of extra time. It went on to penalties, and thanks to a heroic performance from Bucaramanga keeper Leonel Rocco, Los Leopardos prevailed 5–3.  Bucaramanga secured their immediate return to Primera A, while Cúcuta was forced to wait until 2005. This match was the only time that two rival teams from the same region have played a match determining promotion or relegation in the Colombian football championship.

The most recent meeting between the clubs was during a promotion playoff at the start of the 2015 season. Cúcuta won the match and went on to clinch promotion to the top tier, while Bucaramanga finished dead last in the group after only playing two matches.

Fans
"Fortaleza Leoparda Sur" is the name of the main fan group of Atletico Bucaramanga. It was founded in 1998 by young people in order to support the team, but over time more questionable elements attached themselves to the group. As with many other such groups, Fortaleza Leoparda Sur is seen as the expression of social problems larger than football.

They occupy the south grandstand of the Estadio Alfonso López and have participated in peaceful protests in order to request government support to solve the difficult situation of the Club, but have also taken part in a number of acts of violence. In 2011, they physically and verbally attacked players of their team for bad results. The next year, on 10 March 2012 some of them fought against other hooligans in the Estadio Arturo Cumplido Sierra in Sincelejo in the middle of the game between Sucre FC and Bucaramanga. One man was seriously injured and 19 were arrested by the police.

Honours
Categoría Primera A:
Runners-up (1): 1996–97

Categoría Primera B:
Winners (2): 1995, 2015
Runners-up (1): 2009

International competitions
Copa Libertadores: 1 appearance
1998: Round of 16

Current squad

Notable former players

First golden age (1951)

The 1960s

The 1970s

The 1980s

The 1990s

The 2000s

Managers
 Jorge Luis Pinto (2001)
 César Maturana (2003)
 Alexis García (2004–05)
 Miguel Augusto Prince (2007, 2010, 2013)
 Jesús "Kiko" Barrios (2010)
 Bernardo Redín (2013–2014)
 Jose Manuel "Willy" Rodriguez (2014–2016)
 Jose Flabio Torres (2016)
 Harold Rivera (2017)
 Fernando Castro (2017)
 Jaime de la Pava (2017)
 Diego Cagna (2018)

Bibliography
Alvarez, Alfonso (2000), Vida, pasión, muerte y resurección del Atlético Bucaramanga (in Spanish)

References

External links

 Official Website
 Atletico Bucaramanga on DIMAYOR

 
Football clubs in Colombia
Association football clubs established in 1949
1949 establishments in Colombia
Categoría Primera A clubs
Categoría Primera B clubs